Chin is a surname.

Origins
As a Chinese surname, Chin could originate from numerous Chinese characters including the following, listed by their spelling in Mandarin Pinyin:
Chen, spelled Chin based on its pronunciation in multiple varieties of Chinese including Hakka. This spelling of the surname is particularly common in Jamaica, to the extent that other Jamaicans will often use the nickname "Miss Chin" to address any Chinese Jamaican woman whose name they do not know.
Jīn, spelled Chin in the Wade–Giles system used until the mid-20th century and still widespread in Taiwan.
Jìn, spelled Chin in the Wade–Giles system.
Qián, spelled Chin based on its pronunciation in Cantonese. Written with a character meaning "money", according to tradition this originated as an occupational surname during the Western Zhou dynasty.
Qín, spelled Chin based on a simplification of the Wade–Giles spelling Ch'in. This originated as a toponymic surname, referring either to the state of Qin or to later places with the same name.

As a Korean surname, Chin is the McCune–Reischauer romanisation of the four surnames more commonly spelled Jin in the Revised Romanization of Korean. There is no modern Korean surname which Revised Romanization would spell as Chin.

As an English surname, Chin is a variant spelling of Chinn (from Middle English  or ), which originated as a nickname for people with prominent or distinctive chins.

Statistics
The 2000 South Korean census found 170,980 people with the four Korean surnames spelled Chin in McCune–Reischauer. However, relatively few South Koreans with these surnames choose to spell them as Chin. In a study based on year 2007 application data for South Korean passports, 94.3% of the applicants with one of these surnames chose the spelling Jin for their passport, while only 4.7% chose the spelling Chin.

According to statistics cited by Patrick Hanks, 1,504 people on the island of Great Britain and 17 on the island of Ireland bore the surname Chin in 2011. In 1881 there were 53 people with the surname in Great Britain, primarily at Cornwall.

The 2010 United States Census found 27,487 people with the surname Chin, making it the 1,279th-most-common name overall. This represented an increase in absolute numbers, but a decrease in relative frequency, from 25,673 (1,255th-most-common) in the 2000 Census. In both censuses, slightly more than three quarters of the bearers of the surname identified as Asian, about 6% as White, and about 6% as Black. It was the 50th-most-common surname among respondents to the 2000 Census who identified as Asian.

People

Government, law, and politics
Larry Chin (1922–1986), Chinese-born American CIA officer
Peter Chin (born 1941), New Zealand politician
Ming Chin (born 1942), American judge
Peter Chin Fah Kui (born 1945), Malaysian politician
Elias Camsek Chin (born 1949), Palauan politician
Chin Young (born 1950), South Korean politician
Chin Hsiao-hui (born 1951), Taiwanese politician
Chin Tet Yung (born 1951), Singaporean politician
Denny Chin (born 1954), American federal judge
Margaret Chin (born 1954), American politician of Chinese descent
Maria Chin Abdullah (born Chin Cheen Lian , 1956), Malaysian politician
Ben Chin (born 1964), Canadian political advisor
Chin Wan (born 1964), Hong Kong localist activist
Doug Chin (born 1966), American lawyer and politician from Hawaii
Chin Bun Sean, Cambodian politician
Gabriel J. Chin, American law professor
Chin Liew Ten, Singaporean philosophy professor

Music
Eddie Chin (born 1948), American bassist
Vincent "Randy" Chin (1937–2003), Jamaican record producer
Leonard Chin (born 1953), Jamaican reggae record producer
Clive Chin (born 1954), Jamaican record producer
Gordon Shi-Wen Chin (born 1957), Taiwanese composer
Unsuk Chin (born 1961), South Korean composer of classical music
Tessanne Chin (born 1985), Jamaican recording artist
Esther Applunius Chin (born 1987), Malaysian singer
Robotaki (born Preston Anthony Chin, 1991), Canadian DJ and producer
Meg Lee Chin, American musician
Valentine Chin, Jamaican guitarist

Science and engineering
Chin Fung Kee (1920–1990), Malaysian civil engineer
Roland Chin (born 1952), Hong Kong electrical engineering professor 
Wynne Chin (born ), American management information systems professor
Lynda Chin (born 1968), Chinese-born American medical doctor
Karen Chin, American paleontologist and taphonomist
Chin Saik Yoon, Malaysian information and communication technologies scholar
James Chin, American public health epidemiologist

Sport
Chin Kuai-Ti (1915–?), Chinese boxer
Honson Chin (born 1956), Jamaican cyclist
Colin Chin (born 1961), American ice hockey player
Carla Chin (born 1966), Canadian football goalkeeper
Tiffany Chin (born 1967), American figure skating coach
Jimmy Chin (born 1973), American mountaineer
Krissy Chin (born 1980), American figure competitor
Chin Eei Hui (born 1982), Malaysian badminton player
Gordon Chin (born 1983), Canadian soccer midfielder
Chin Chum (born 1985), Cambodian football striker
Chin Kah Mun (born 1985), Malaysian badminton player
Dennis Chin (born 1987), Jamaican football forward
Marc Chin (born 1987), Caymanian cricketer
Shawn Chin (born 1989), American soccer midfielder and forward
Andrew Chin (born 1992), American baseball pitcher
Casey Chin (born 1992), Canadian football linebacker
Lee Chin (born 1992), Irish hurler, Gaelic football, and soccer player
Christian Didier Chin (born 2000), Malaysian tennis player

Television and film
Chin Tsi-ang (1909–2007), Chinese martial artist and actress
Chin Han (actor, born 1938), Hong Kong actor
Chin Han (actor, born 1946), Taiwanese actor
Charlie Chin (born 1948), Taiwanese actor
Glen Chin (1948–2018), American actor of Chinese descent
Chin Shih-chieh (born 1951), Taiwanese actor
Marcus Chin (born 1954), Singaporean actor
Chin Siu-ho (born 1963), Hong Kong actor
Chin Ka-lok (born 1965), Hong Kong actor
Sheila Chin (born 1969), Hong Kong actress
Feodor Chin (born 1974), American actor
Cheryl Chin (born 1979), Singaporean actress
Jolene Chin (born 1980), Malaysian actress
Ashley Chin (born 1982), English actor of Jamaican descent
Felicia Chin (born 1984), Singaporean actress
Lee Lin Chin, Indonesian-born Australian radio and television presenter

Writers and humanities scholars
Chin Shunshin (1924–2015), Japanese novelist from Taiwan
Frank Chin (born 1940), American writer
Annping Chin (born 1950), American history lecturer
Marilyn Chin (born 1955), Hong Kong-born American writer
Chin Jung-kwon (born 1963), South Korean aesthetician
Justin Chin (1969–2015), Malaysian-born American poet
Staceyann Chin (born 1972), Jamaican poet
Mei Chin (born 1977), American writer

Other
Chin Gee Hee (1844–1929), Chinese merchant in Guangdong and Seattle, Washington
Chin Chun Hock (1844–1927), first Chinese man to settle in Seattle, Washington
Arthur Chin (1913–1997), American World War II fighter pilot in China
Chin Peng (1924–2013), Malaysian communist leader
Leeann Chin (restaurateur) (1933–2010), Guangzhou-born American restaurateur
Mel Chin (born 1951), American visual artist
Chin Dae-je (born 1952), South Korean businessman and politician
Vincent Jen Chin (1955–1982), American murder victim
Curtis Chin (born 1965), American businessman
Alan Chin (artist) (born 1987), American artist of Chinese descent
Alan Chin (photographer), American photographer
Walter Chin, Jamaican photographer

Fictional characters
The Crimson Chin, from American animated television series The Fairly OddParents
Jordi Chin, from Ubisoft's video games series Watch Dogs

See also
Chinn, surname 

Chin Kung (born 1927), Chinese Buddhist monk (Chin Kung is his dharma name)
Eusoff Chin (full name Mohamed Eusoff bin Chin, born 1936), Malaysian lawyer (Chin is a patronymic)
Chin Sian Thang (1938–2021), chairman of the Zomi Congress for Democracy in Myanmar (Burmese names do not have surnames)
Botak Chin (1951–1981), Malaysian gangster ( is an epithet meaning 'bald', and Chin is part of his given name)

References

Chinese-language surnames
English-language surnames
Multiple Chinese surnames